Robert John Kennedy (born 3 June 1972) is a former New Zealand cricketer who played in four Test matches and seven One Day Internationals for New Zealand in 1996.

His best international figures of 3/28 came on his Test debut against Zimbabwe, his first Test wicket was that of Andy Flower. Robert Kennedy currently lives in Lower Hutt working for Fucor.

References

1972 births
Living people
New Zealand One Day International cricketers
New Zealand Test cricketers
New Zealand cricketers
Otago cricketers
Wellington cricketers
Cricketers at the 1996 Cricket World Cup